Charles F. Horn (known as Chuck Horn) was a Republican member of the Ohio Senate, serving the 6th district from 1985 to 2000.  His district encompassed suburban Dayton, Ohio.  In 2000, he faced term limits, and was succeeded by Jeff Jacobson.

External links
https://web.archive.org/web/20101204203229/http://great-lakes.net/lists/glin-announce/1998-09/msg00040.html

Republican Party Ohio state senators
Living people
Year of birth missing (living people)